The Leon Schiller National Film School is a Polish academy for future actors, directors, photographers, camera operators and television staff. It was founded on 8 March 1948 in Łódź (Lodz).

History

Until 1958, the school existed as two separate schools: one for actors and the other for filmmakers. The schools and the Polish cinema industry were moved from Warsaw to the nearby city of Łódź after World War II. This move was initially seen as a temporary measure, thus the name of the actors' school was The National Higher School of Theatre in Warsaw with seat in Łódź. Its creator and the first rector was the Polish actor Leon Schiller, current namesake of the school. In 1949, it was divided into two branches; one actually moved to Warsaw and the other one remained in Łódź under the directorship of Kazimierz Dejmek (since 1950).

The years leading up to the merger in 1958 were those in which notable artists of the Polish Film School created the reputation of the Łódź Film School as the most liberal and least Communist institution of higher education in Poland. Among the most notable alumni of that period were Andrzej Munk, Janusz Morgenstern, Andrzej Wajda, and Kazimierz Kutz. In 1954, they were joined by Roman Polanski.

After 1958, the school became a cultural think-tank of Poland, with many outsiders and artists not supported by the Communist authorities joining it. Various discussion clubs and relative liberty of speech promoted by the new rector, Jerzy Toeplitz, added to its value. For instance, two of the students of the university (Jerzy Matuszkiewicz and Witold Sobociński) became the first jazz musicians in Poland after World War II to be allowed by the authorities to organize a concert. Kirk Douglas visited the school in 1966. His visit was documented in the self-titled documentary Kirk Douglasy.

After the events of March 1968, the period of liberty came to an end. Toeplitz was fired, as were most of the tutors. However, with the advent of Edward Gierek and his regime, the school once again started to bloom.

The School has three Oscar-winning alumni: Roman Polanski, Andrzej Wajda, and Zbigniew Rybczyński, while alumnus Krzysztof Kieślowski was nominated for an Oscar. Both Polanski and Wajda won the Palme d'Or at the Cannes Film Festival in 2002 and 1981, respectively.

Polish Internet Movie Database
The Polish Internet Movie Database has been maintained by the school since 1998.

Notable alumni

Directors

Feliks Falk
Dariusz Gajewski
Wojciech Has
Kazimierz Karabasz
Dorota Kędzierzawska
Jan Kidawa-Błoński
Krzysztof Kieślowski, nominated for an Academy Award, Golden Lion winner
Jan Komasa, nominated for an Academy Award
Grzegorz Królikiewicz
Kazimierz Kutz
Jan Łomnicki
Jan Machulski
Juliusz Machulski
Andrzej Munk
Janusz Nasfeter
Władysław Pasikowski
Radosław Piwowarski
Marek Piwowski
Roman Polanski, Academy Award, BAFTA Award, Golden Globe and Palme d'Or winner
Wojciech Kasperski
Barbara Sass
Jerzy Skolimowski, Palme d'Or winner and Golden Bear winner
Piotr Szulkin
Piotr Trzaskalski
Andrzej Wajda, Academy Award, BAFTA Award, Golden Bear and Palme d'Or winner
Maciej Wojtyszko
Krzysztof Zanussi, Golden Lion winner
Emily Young, BAFTA Award winner
Maria Sadowska
Urszula Urbaniak
Mostafa Derkaoui
Abdelkarim Derkaoui

Cinematographers

Wit Dąbal
Paweł Edelman, nominated for an Academy Award and BAFTA Award
Sławomir Idziak, nominated for an Academy Award
Edward Kłosiński
Jan Jakub Kolski
Krzysztof Ptak
Zbigniew Rybczyński, Academy Award winner
Przemysław Skwirczyński
Piotr Sobociński, nominated for an Academy Award
Witold Sobociński
Dariusz Wolski, nominated for an Academy Award 2021
Hubert Taczanowski
Andrzej Bartkowiak
Hoyte van Hoytema, nominated for an Academy Award and BAFTA Award winner
Piotr Lenar
Łukasz Żal, nominated for two Academy Awards, winner of the ASC award

Actors

Szymon Bobrowski
Barbara Brylska
Małgorzata Foremniak
Janusz Gajos
Tomasz Konieczny
Jerzy Matuszkiewicz (jazz musician)
Cezary Pazura
Beata Pozniak
Pola Raksa
Zbigniew Zamachowski

See also

 Cinema of Poland
 Film Polski
 Polish Film School
 New York Polish Film Festival
 Seattle Polish Film Festival
 Analog photography
 Digital versus film photography
 History of cinema
 List of famous Poles
 List of film festivals
 List of film formats
 List of film techniques
 List of motion picture-related topics (Extensive alphabetical listing and glossary).
 List of photographic processes
 List of video-related topics
 Outline of film

References

External links
 
 Official website of the Film Production Department 
 Polish Internet Movie Database 

 
Educational institutions established in 1948
Drama schools in Poland
1948 establishments in Poland